Saphan Han is a small bridge over the Khlong Rop Krung (Rop Krung canal; lit: around the city canal), also known as Khlong Ong Ang (Ong Ang canal; lit: canal of jars and pots) in the areas of Bangkok's Chakkrawat sub-district, Samphanthawong district and Wang Burapha Phirom sub-district, Phra Nakhon district. It is also the name of the surrounding area.

The bridge was built along with the excavation of the Khlong Rop Krung at the beginning of Rattanakosin (presently Bangkok) in the reign of King Phutthayotfa Chulalok (Rama I). At that time Saphan Han was a bridge made of a single plank for people crossing from outer city to inner city. On side was firmly fixed while the other side laid across the opposite side without fixing which could be turned for the boat to pass. Hence the name "Saphan Han", which means "turntable bridge" or "swing bridge". In the Ayutthaya period, it was noted that there are similar bridges at Khlong Takhian (Takhian canal; lit: Hopea odorata canal) and Khlong Wat Yai Chai Mongkhon (Wat Yai Chai Mongkhon's canal). This type of bridge can be found everywhere in Bangkok and other provinces in old days.

Later in the reign of King Phutthaloetla Naphalai (Rama II), when Saphan Han disintegrated. It has been rebuilt with two planks and can't turn the same again. In the reign of King Mongkut (Rama IV), the steel frame was added to the bridge and its floor was still movable with the aid pulley to open for the boat to pass through. During the reign of King Chulalongkorn (Rama V) was rebuilt as a corridor wooden bridge with a width of about 1.5 m (4 ft 11 in), the interior was also divided into small rooms for sale. It was based on the Rialto bridge in Venice and the Ponte Vecchio in Florence, both of which are historic bridges in Italy. Including there are also walkways and small shophouses on each side of the canal, to be a center of trade as well. For the current Saphan Han is a reinforced concrete bridge built in 1962, but the name of the bridge remains the same as a memorial to commemorate the first bridge that was constructed.

During the reigns of King Mongkut and King Chulalongkorn, Saphan Han was considered one of the most important and bustling shopping district of Bangkok. Since it was in the end of Chinatown by Yaowarat was the main artery and opposite to Little India or Phahurat neighbourhood. It was the residence of the Indians in Thailand. In those days, it was full of business and commerce, such as fruits from abroad, canned foods, chewing tobaccos and herbs, as well as businesses that were illegal and prone to immorals, such as gambling houses, opium dens and brothels. In addition, it was also close to many landmarks viz Saphan Lek, Wang Burapha, Thieves' Market or better known as Woeng Nakhon Khasem, etc.

Today, Saphan Han remains an important and bustling shopping district, as in the past. It is full of shops in the form of a shophouse. There're many kinds of goods sold, such as clothing, fresh and dried food, fruits, kitchenwares, kid toys, cosmetics, buttons, fabrics, textiles, and mostly ladies' items. It is considered to be the tip of Sampheng or the official name Soi Wanit 1, the long narrow lane lined from the center of Yaowarat. Sampeng is divided into three parts: first part starts from Song Sawat road near Song Wat road and separated by Ratchawong road near Ratchawong pier, the second part starts from Ratchawong road and separated by Chakkrawat road near Wat Tuek intersection, and third part begins from Chakkrawat road through Saphan Han as far as terminating at Chak Phet road opposite to Phahurat. In this phase also known as "Trok Hua Med" (ตรอกหัวเม็ด), and although it is only a narrow and busy lane, it is also home to two Chinese shrines, Pung Tao Kong shrine and Chun Sieng Chow Sue shrine.

Since October 2015, the Thai government has a policy to improve the scenery of the Khlong Rop Krung and Khlong Ong Ang, include there are also renovate five bridges in a row viz Saphan Lek, Bhanubandhu bridge, Saphan Han, Borphitphimuk bridge, and Osathanond bridge is the last at the area of Phra Pok Klao bridge's foot, which cross to Thonburi side. The demolition of various shophouses surrounding it, such as Saphan Lek, or Khlong Thom, Saphan Han is one of them. When the stores next to the canal were demolished, the bridge can be seen clearly after being covered for over 40 years.

See also
Saphan Lek
Khlong Thom
Saphan Hok

References

External links

Shopping districts and streets in Bangkok
Neighbourhoods of Bangkok
Chinese-Thai culture
Samphanthawong district
Phra Nakhon district
Bridges in Bangkok